was a Japanese voice actress affiliated with 81 Produce. She died under medical care on 14 March 2020.

Selected roles

References

External links
  at 81 Produce 
 

1976 births
2020 deaths
Japanese video game actresses
Japanese voice actresses
Place of death missing
81 Produce voice actors
Voice actresses from Okinawa Prefecture
21st-century Japanese actresses